Pinnacle Rock, sometimes named Roca de la Aguja or Pinnacle Island, is a rocky island, rising to 120 m above sea level, in the South Shetland Islands. Its current name, made official in 1952, was probably suggested by members of the British expedition under Shackleton, 1914–16, who sighted and described this feature as a pillar of rock during their refuge at Elephant Island following the loss of the Endurance.

See also 
 List of Antarctic and sub-Antarctic islands

References

Uninhabited islands
Islands of the South Shetland Islands